KRKG may refer to:

 KRKG-LP, a defunct low-power television station (channel 9) formerly licensed to serve Lewiston, Missouri, United States
 KQFO, a radio station (100.1 FM) licensed to serve Pasco, Washington, United States, which held the call sign KRKG-FM from 2010 to 2016